Xavier Bettel (born 3 March 1973) is a Luxembourger lawyer and politician serving as Prime Minister of Luxembourg since 2013. He was previously a member of the Chamber of Deputies (1999–2013) and Mayor of Luxembourg City (2011–2013).

Bettel is a member of the Democratic Party (DP). Following the 2013 general election, he took office as Prime Minister and succeeded Jean-Claude Juncker of the Christian Social People's Party (CSV). Bettel became the first openly gay prime minister in the world to be reelected for a second term in 2018, when his mandate was renewed.

Early life
Bettel was born on 3 March 1973 in Luxembourg City. His father, Claude Bettel, was a wine merchant. Bettel said he has an Orthodox Russian grandfather and a Polish-Jewish grandfather, while his parents were Catholics. His mother Aniela is a grandniece of the Russian composer Sergei Rachmaninoff. After completing his secondary school studies at Lycée Hélène Boucher in Thionville, Bettel obtained a master's degree in Public and European Law and a DEA in Political Science and Public Law from Nancy 2 University in Nancy, France. He also studied maritime law as well as canon law at Aristotle University in Thessaloniki, Greece, where he was studying thanks to the Erasmus Programme. For four years in the early 2000s he hosted Sonndes em 8, a weekly talkshow, on the now-defunct private T.TV television network. In 2017, he also received an Honorary doctorate from Sacred Heart University Luxembourg.

Political life

Municipal politics
In the elections of 1999, Bettel was elected to Luxembourg City's communal council, finishing sixth on the DP's list. Two years after his election to the local council, on 12 July 2001, he was certified as a lawyer. On 28 November 2005, after the municipal elections in which he was placed fourth on the DP list, Bettel was appointed échevin (alderman) in the council of Luxembourg City.

Following municipal elections on 9 October 2011, Bettel was sworn in as Mayor of Luxembourg on 24 November 2011. He resigned from his position as DP leader in the Chamber of Deputies, which he had held since 2009.

National politics
Bettel ran for the Chamber of Deputies in the 1999 general election; he finished tenth amongst DP candidates in the Centre constituency, with the top seven being elected. However, the DP overtook the Luxembourg Socialist Workers' Party (LSAP) as the second-largest party; its members formed the majority of the new government as the Christian Social People's Party's (CSV) coalition partners. Thus, with Lydie Polfer and Anne Brasseur vacating their seats to take roles in the government, as well as Colette Flesch not taking her seat so as to focus on her role as Member of the European Parliament (MEP), Bettel was appointed to the Chamber of Deputies, starting 12 August 1999.

By the time of the 2004 general election, Bettel had significantly consolidated his position; he finished fourth (of the five DP members elected), assuring him a seat in the Chamber of Deputies.

Prime Minister

First term

In 2013, Bettel was elected leader of the Democratic Party. In the 2013 general election, he led the party to a third-ranked position in parliamentary seats. On 25 October, Bettel was designated by Grand Duke Henri as the formateur for the next government. He assumed his post as Luxembourg's Prime Minister on 4 December 2013. In the government's coalition of the Democratic Party (DP), Luxembourg Socialist Workers' Party (LSAP) and The Greens, he led the cabinet with co-Deputy Prime Ministers Etienne Schneider and Félix Braz. In his first term, he also held the functions of Minister of State, Minister for Communications and the Media, Minister for Culture and Minister for Religious Affairs.

Second term

Following the 2018 election, he became the first openly gay prime minister in the world to be reelected for a second term. He began his second term when his government was formed on 5 December 2018, which he currently leads with co-Deputy Prime Ministers François Bausch and Dan Kersch. The government is a continuation between the Democratic Party, the Luxembourg Socialist Workers' Party and The Greens from the Bettel I government, with minor changes.

On 16 September 2019, following a short bilateral meeting on the status of Brexit negotiations, Bettel continued a press conference without British Prime Minister Boris Johnson, after Johnson abruptly pulled out due to an anti-Brexit protest held by British citizens living in Luxembourg. Bettel gestured towards Johnson's empty podium and confirmed that the UK Government had not tabled any concrete proposals for amendments to the UK's Withdrawal Agreement, particularly the "Irish backstop" that Johnson wished to replace. This being despite the public pronouncements of Prime Minister Johnson and the UK's departure date from the EU fast approaching. Pro-Brexit UK media reported the matter as an ambush, whilst other UK and international media outlets largely saw the incident, as well as the reaction of pro-Brexit UK media outlets to it, as confirming the increasing hypersensitivity of pro-Brexit pundits and politicians to criticism.

On 29 February 2020, all of Luxembourg's public transport became free of charge as a result of the Bettel II government coalition agreement.

Personal life
Bettel, who is openly gay, has stated that increasingly in Luxembourg "people do not consider the fact of whether someone is gay or not". Bettel is Luxembourg's first openly gay Prime Minister. Worldwide, he is the third openly gay head of government following Iceland's Prime Minister Jóhanna Sigurðardóttir (2009–2013) and Belgium's Prime Minister Elio Di Rupo (2011–2014). As of 2020, he is one of two openly gay world leaders in office, the other being Ana Brnabić, the Prime Minister of Serbia.

Bettel has been married to Gauthier Destenay since 2015, the same year that same-sex marriage was introduced to Luxembourg.

COVID-19 hospitalisation
On 4 July 2021, Bettel was admitted to hospital following a COVID-19 diagnosis on 27 June. The move was initially described as precautionary and for tests. It was reported that he experienced "mild symptoms" such as high temperature and headache. The following day, it was reported that he was in a "serious but stable" condition and would remain hospitalised. On 7 July 2021, the government said that Bettel would remain hospitalised a "little bit longer" due to low saturation of oxygen in his blood and that he was recovering "little by little". On 8 July 2021, Bettel was discharged from hospital. It was announced he would resume activities soon via remote work for the rest of his isolation period. Bettel thanked health authorities for the treatment during his hospitalisation period.

Honours and awards

Allegations of plagiarism 
"In his thesis at the University of Nancy there is not one correct reference," wrote Pol Reuter with reference to research by Reporter.lu. The master's thesis, submitted in 1999, is dedicated to the topic of electoral reform at the European Parliament. Allegedly, only two of the total 56 pages were free of plagiarism. The plagiarism findings are said to have been confirmed by several independent researchers. Bettel stated he wrote this thesis with a clear conscience, although "from today’s standpoint, it could have – yes, maybe should have – been done differently." He also stated he would accept the findings of the University of Lorraine on the matter.

See also
 Bettel–Schneider Ministry I (2013–2018)
 Bettel–Schneider Ministry II (2018–present)
 List of openly LGBT heads of government
 List of the first LGBT holders of political offices

References

External links

 Luxembourg government official biography

|-

|-

|-

|-

Corine Cahen

1973 births
Living people
21st-century Luxembourgian politicians
Councillors in Luxembourg City
Democratic Party (Luxembourg) politicians
Gay politicians
LGBT heads of government
LGBT mayors
Luxembourgian LGBT politicians
Luxembourgian people of French descent
Luxembourgian people of Russian descent
Mayors of Luxembourg City
Members of the Chamber of Deputies (Luxembourg) from Centre
Ministers for Communications of Luxembourg
Prime Ministers of Luxembourg
Grand Crosses of the Order of the Crown (Belgium)
Recipients of the Order of the Cross of Terra Mariana, 1st Class
Grand Crosses of the Order of Honour (Greece)
LGBT legislators
Alumni of the Erasmus Programme